Grand Duke Alexei Petrovich of Russia (28 February 1690 – 26 June 1718) was a Russian Tsarevich. He was born in Moscow, the son of Tsar Peter I and his first wife, Eudoxia Lopukhina. Alexei despised his father and repeatedly thwarted Peter's plans to raise him as successor to the throne. His brief defection to Austria scandalized the Russian government, leading to harsh repressions against Alexei and his associates. Alexei died after interrogation under torture, and his younger half brother Peter Petrovich became the new heir apparent.

Childhood
The young Alexei was brought up by his mother, who fostered an atmosphere of disdain towards his father, the Tsar. Alexei's relations with his father suffered from the hatred between his father and his mother, as it was very difficult for him to feel affection for his mother's worst persecutor. From the ages of 6 to 9, Alexei was educated by his tutor Vyazemsky, but after the removal of his mother by Peter the Great to the Suzdal Intercession Convent, Alexei was confined to the care of educated foreigners, who taught him history, geography, mathematics and French.

Military career
In 1703, Alexei was ordered to follow the army to the field as a private in an artillery regiment. In 1704, he was present at the capture of Narva. At this period, the preceptors of the Tsarevich had the highest opinion of his ability. Alexei had strong leanings towards archaeology and ecclesiology. However, Peter had wished his son and heir to dedicate himself to the service of new Russia, and demanded from him unceasing labour in order to maintain Russia's new wealth and power. Painful relations between father and son, quite apart from the prior personal antipathies, were therefore inevitable. It was an additional misfortune for Alexei that his father should have been too busy to attend to him just as he was growing up from boyhood to manhood. He was left in the hands of reactionary boyars and priests, who encouraged him to hate his father and wish for the death of the Tsar.

In 1708, Peter sent Alexei to Smolensk to collect supplies and recruits, and after that to Moscow to fortify it against Charles XII of Sweden. At the end of 1709, Alexei went to Dresden for one year. There, he finished lessons in French, German, mathematics and fortification. After his education, Alexei married Princess Charlotte of Brunswick-Wolfenbüttel, whose family was connected by marriage to many of the great families of Europe (for example, Charlotte's sister Elizabeth was married to Holy Roman Emperor Charles VI, ruler of the Habsburg monarchy). He met with Princess Charlotte, both were pleased with each other and the marriage went forward. In theory, Alexei could have refused the marriage, and he had been encouraged by his father to at least meet his intended. "Why haven't you written to tell me what you thought about her?" wrote Peter  in a letter dated  13 August 1710.

The marriage contract was signed in September. The wedding was celebrated at Torgau, Germany, on  14 October 1711 (O.S.). One of the terms of the marriage contract agreed to by Alexei was that while any forthcoming children were to be raised in the Orthodox faith, Charlotte herself was allowed to retain her Protestant faith, an agreement opposed by Alexei's followers.

As for the marriage itself, the first 6 months went well but quickly became a failure within the next 6 months. Alexei was drunk constantly and pronounced his bride "pock-marked" and "too thin". He insisted on separate apartments and ignored her in public.

Three weeks later, the bridegroom was hurried away by his father to Toruń to superintend the provisioning of the Russian troops in Poland. For the next twelve months Alexei was kept constantly on the move. His wife joined him at Toruń in December, but in April 1712 a peremptory ukase ordered him off to the army in Pomerania, and in the autumn of the same year he was forced to accompany his father on a tour of inspection through Finland. 

He had two children with Charlotte:
Natalia Alexeievna Romanova (21 July 1714 – 3 December 1728)
Peter Alexeyevich Romanov (23 October 1715 – 30 January 1730)

Peter Alexeyevich would succeed as the Emperor Peter II in 1727. With his death in 1730, the direct male-line of the House of Romanov became extinct.

After the birth of Natalia in 1714, Alexei brought his long-time Finnish serf mistress Afrosinia to live in the palace. Some historians speculate that it was his conservative powerbase's disapproval of his foreign, non-Orthodox bride, more so than her appearance, that caused Alexei to spurn Charlotte. Another influence was Alexander Kikin, a high-placed official who had fallen out with the Tsar and had been deprived of his estates.

Flight
Immediately on his return from Finland, Alexei was dispatched by his father to Staraya Russa and Lake Ladoga to see to the building of new ships. This was the last commission entrusted to him, since Peter had not been satisfied with his son's performance and his lack of enthusiasm. When Peter asked Alexei to show his progress in mechanics and mathematics, the son responded by shooting himself in the right hand, and Peter took no more interest in him. Nevertheless, Peter made one last effort to reclaim his son. On 22 October 1715 (O.S.), Charlotte died, after giving birth to a son, the grand-duke Peter, the future Emperor Peter II. On the day of the funeral, Peter sent Alexei a stern letter, urging him to take interest in the affairs of the state. Peter threatened to cut him off if he did not acquiesce in his father's plans. Alexei wrote a pitiful reply to his father, offering to renounce the succession in favour of his infant son Peter. Peter would agree but on the condition that Alexei remove himself as a dynastic threat and become a monk.

While Alexei was pondering his options, on 26 August 1716 Peter wrote from abroad, urging him, if he desired to remain tsarevich, to join him and the army without delay. Rather than face this ordeal, Alexei fled to Vienna and placed himself under the protection of his brother-in-law, the emperor Charles VI, who sent him for safety first to the Tirolean fortress of Ehrenberg (near Reutte), and finally to the castle of Sant'Elmo at Naples. He was accompanied throughout his journey by Afrosinia. That the emperor sincerely sympathized with Alexei, and suspected Peter of harbouring murderous designs against his son, is plain from his confidential letter to George I of Great Britain, whom he consulted on this delicate affair. Peter felt insulted: the flight of the tsarevich to a foreign potentate was a reproach and a scandal, and he had to be recovered and brought back to Russia at all costs. This difficult task was accomplished by Count Peter Tolstoi, the most subtle and unscrupulous of Peter's servants.

Return

Alexei would only consent to return on his father solemnly swearing, that if he came back he should not be punished in the least, but cherished as a son and allowed to live quietly on his estates and marry Afrosinia.
On 31 January 1718, the tsarevich reached Moscow. Peter had already determined to institute a searching inquisition in order to get at the bottom of the mystery of the flight. On 18 February a confession was extorted from Alexei which implicated most of his friends, and he then publicly renounced the succession to the throne in favour of the baby grand-duke Peter Alexeyevich.

A brutal reign of terror ensued, in the course of which the ex-tsaritsa Eudoxia was dragged from her monastery and publicly tried for alleged adultery, while all who had in any way befriended Alexei were impaled or broken on the wheel while having their flesh torn with red-hot pincers on their bare backs or bare feet slowly roasted over burning coals, and were otherwise done to death. Alexei's servants were beheaded or had their tongues cut out. All this was done to terrorize the reactionaries and isolate the tsarevich.

In April 1718 fresh confessions were extorted from, and in regard to, Alexei. This included the words of Afrosinia, who had turned state's evidence. "I shall bring back the old people..." Alexei is reported to have told her,
"...and choose myself new ones according to my will;
when I become sovereign I shall live in Moscow and leave Saint Petersburg simply as any other town; I won't launch any ships; I shall maintain troops only for defense, and won't make war on anyone; I shall be content with the old domains. In winter I shall live in Moscow, and in summer in Iaroslavl."

Despite this and other hearsay evidence, there were no facts to go upon. The worst that could be brought against him was that he had wished his father's death. In the eyes of Peter, his son was now a self-convicted and most dangerous traitor, whose life was forfeit. But there was no getting over the fact that his father had sworn to pardon him and let him live in peace if he returned to Russia. The whole matter was solemnly submitted to a grand council of prelates, senators, ministers and other dignitaries on 13 June 1718 (O.S.). The clergy, for their part, declared the Tsarevich Alexei,

"...had placed his Confidence in those who loved the ancient Customs, and that he had become acquainted with them by the Discourses they held, wherein they had constantly praised the ancient Manners, and spoke with Distaste of the Novelties his Father had introduced."

Declaring this to be a civil rather than an ecclesiastical matter, the clergy left the matter to the tsar's own decision.

At noon on 24 June (O.S.), the temporal dignitaries — the 126 members of both the Senate and magistrates that comprised the court — declared Alexei guilty and sentenced him to death. But the examination by torture continued, so desperate was Peter to uncover any possible collusion.

On 19 June (O.S.), the weak and ailing tsarevich received twenty-five strokes with the knout, and then, on 24 June (O.S.), he was subject to fifteen more. On 26 June (O.S.), Alexei died in the Peter and Paul fortress in Saint Petersburg, two days after the senate had condemned him to death for conspiring rebellion against his father, and for hoping for the cooperation of the common people and the armed intervention of his brother-in-law, Emperor Charles VI.

Ancestry

References

Attribution:

Further reading
 Grey, Ian. "Peter the Great and the Tsarevich Alexei" History Today (Nov 1974), Vol. 24 Issue 11, pp 754–764, online. 
Matthew S. Anderson, Peter the Great (London: Thames and Hudson, 1978).
Robert Nisbet Bain, The First Romanovs 1613–1725 (London, 1905).
Robert K. Massie, Peter the Great, His Life and World (New York: Ballantine, 1981).
B.H. Sumner, Peter the Great and the Emergence of Russia (London: 1950), pp 91–100.
Fredrick Charles Weber, The Present State of Russia (2 vols.), (1723; reprint, London: Frank Cass and Co, 1968).
Lindsey Hughes, Russia in the Age of Peter the Great (New Haven and London: Yale University Press, 1998).
 Simon Sebag Montefiore, The Romanovs 1613-1918 (London: Weidenfeld & Nicolson, 2016).

External links

1690 births
1718 deaths
Royalty from Moscow
House of Romanov
Heirs apparent who never acceded
Prisoners who died in Russian detention
Russian people who died in prison custody
17th-century Russian people
18th-century people from the Russian Empire
Russian tsareviches
Burials at Saints Peter and Paul Cathedral, Saint Petersburg
Sons of emperors
Prisoners of the Peter and Paul Fortress